Le droit de rêver is the debut album by French singer-songwriter Tal released by Warner Music France. The album debuted at #7 in the SNEP official French  Albums Chart before eventually peaking at #5 and reached #24 in the Belgian French Wallonia Album Charts.

Three singles were released from the album, first "On avance" that reached #29 in France and #44 in Belgium, followed by "Waya Waya" featuring Sean Paul, and the biggest hit "Le sens de la vie" that reached #4 in France and #3 in the French Belgian charts.

Besides the Sean Paul cooperation, there is a second version of "Le sens de la vie" featuring French-Algerian urban artist L'Algérino.

Track list
"On avance" (3:00)
"Waya Waya" (feat. Sean Paul) (2:30)
"Le sens de la vie" (3:28)
"Oublie" (3:33)
"Rien n'est parfait" (3:06)
"Le droit de rêver" (2:41)
"Je prends le large" (2:58)
"Renaître" (3:23)
"Allez, laisse-toi aller" (3:00)
"Au-delà" (3:04)
"Toutes les femmes" (3:27)
"La liberté" (3:07)
"Le sens de la vie" (feat. L'Algérino) (3:47) (Bonus track)

Charts

Weekly charts

Year-end charts

Certifications

References

2012 debut albums
Tal (singer) albums
French-language albums
Warner Music France albums